John William Bettridge (March 19, 1910 – December 10, 1975) was an American football fullback who played at Sandusky High School and later played for the Ohio State Buckeyes in college. He went on to play for the Cleveland Rams in their first season before being traded to the Chicago Bears. It was his only season. He was the father of Ed Bettridge. He died on December 10, 1975 at the age 65.

References

1910 births
1975 deaths
American football fullbacks
Cleveland Rams players
Chicago Bears players
Ohio State Buckeyes football players